Andreu Mayayo i Artal (Samper de Calanda, Aragon, 1959) is a professor of Modern History and vice-dean of the Faculty of Geography and History at the University of Barcelona. He is the editor-in-chief of the Segle XX. Revista Catalana d'Història journal, member of the editorial boards of the Catalan journals L'Avenç, Sàpiens and El Contemporani. He is also a member of the Board of the Democratic Memorial of the Government of Catalonia and a regular contributor to media debates at RAC 1, Debat de La 1 of Televisión Española, RNE Ràdio 4, Catalunya Ràdio and Barcelona TV.

As a historian, his research has been directed towards the local history, rural areas, social movements and the Spanish transition to democracy.

Politically, he has held several posts within the parties Unified Socialist Party of Catalonia and Initiative for Catalonia Greens. He has been the mayor of Montblanc, Tarragona twice, between 1991–1993 and 1995–1999. In 1998 he was charged with perversion of justice.

Main works 
 La Conca de Barberà 1890–1939: de la crisi agrària a la guerra civil (Centre d'Estudis de la Conca de Barberà, 1986)
 De pagesos a ciutadans. Cent anys de sindicalisme i cooperativisme agraris a Catalunya (1893–1994) (Afers, 1995)
 La ruptura catalana. Les eleccions del 15 de juny de 1977 (Afers, 2002)
 Recuperació de la memòria històrica o reparació moral de les víctimes? (L'Avenç, núm 314, 2006)
 La veu del PSUC. Josep Solè Barberà (1913–1988) (L'Avenç, 2007; hi ha versió castellana a RBA, 2008)

Other works 
 Aracil, Rafael; Segura, Antoni; Mayayo i Artal, Andreu. Memòria de la transició a Espanya i a Catalunya IV: els joves de la transició. Universitat de Barcelona. Publicacions i Edicions, juliol 2003. .
 Mayayo i Artal, Andreu. Destrucció del món rural català, la: 1880–1980. Universitat de Barcelona. Publicacions i Edicions, gener 1991. .
 Mayayo i Artal, Andreu. Josep Torrents, (1899–1943): pagès de Bellveí del Penedès: dirigent agrari català. El Mèdol, abril 1988. .

References 

1959 births
Historians from Catalonia
Living people
People from the Province of Teruel
Academic staff of the University of Barcelona